General elections were held in Palau on 30 November 1984 to elect a President, Vice-President, Senate and House of Delegates. All candidates ran as independents. Incumbent Haruo Remeliik won the election for President with 50.9% of the vote, whilst Alfonso Oiterong was re-elected to the post of Vice-President. 

In the parliamentary elections, only five incumbent Senators were re-elected, while 11 of the 16 members of the House of Delegates were returned. Voter turnout was 83.9%.

Results

President

Vice-President

Senate

House of Delegates

References

Palau
General
Elections in Palau
Non-partisan elections
Presidential elections in Palau